Maati Maay (A Grave-Keeper's Tale) is a Marathi social drama film directed and produced by Chitra Palekar based on Baayen, a story by Bengali novelist Mahasweta Devi. This film was released on 17 March 2007 under the banner of Dnya Films. This was Nandita Das's Marathi cinema Debut and she received Maharashtra State Film Awards as best actress in 2007.

Plot
The movie revolves with the story of human relationship and superstitions of patriarchal society. Chandi, is a young woman from a lower caste, whose family has traditionally been in charge of a children's graveyard. After the death of her father Chandi inherits the job in graveyard. She performs the unpleasant task of burying the village's children which affects her body and mind. Her husband, Narsu, fails to understand Chandi's state of mind; society forces her to continue the job. Finally Chandi rebels, and her community becomes extremely hostile to her.

Cast
 Nandita Das as Chandi
 Mukta Barve as Yashoda
 Atul Kulkarni as Narsu
 Kshitij Gavande as Bhagirath

References

External links
 

2007 films
2000s Marathi-language films
2007 drama films
Indian drama films
Films based on Indian novels
Films based on works by Mahasweta Devi